Tut Kalan is a village in Nakodar. Nakodar is a city in the district Jalandhar of Indian state of Punjab.

Tut Kalan lies on the Nakodar-Kapurthala road which is almost 1 km from it.

The nearest railway station to this village Nakodar railway station at a distance of 5 km.

References

External links
Official website of Punjab Govt. with Tut Kalan's details

Villages in Jalandhar district